The Bell Boy is a 1918 American two-reel silent comedy film directed by Roscoe "Fatty" Arbuckle for the Comique film company.
The film stars Arbuckle and Buster Keaton as bellboys in the Elk's Head Hotel. Much of the material in the film was later re-used by Keaton in his 1937 film Love Nest on Wheels. One sequence involving a mop was reused by Keaton in one of his last film appearances in The Scribe.

Plot
Fatty and Buster play a pair of incompetent bellhops who are constantly careless with guest's luggage and slack on the job. One morning a new customer, who resembles Rasputin the Mystic, arrives at the hotel asking for a shave and Fatty, being a skilled barber, is happy to oblige. He cuts his hair and facial hair in a way which first makes him resemble Ulysses S. Grant, Abraham Lincoln and finally Kaiser Wilhelm (America had entered World War I only months earlier). His attention is soon turned, as is Buster's, to an attractive new hotel manicurist, Cutie Cuticle, and they begin to bicker and fight over her. While Fatty finishes dealing with Rasputin, Buster gets stuck in the hotel elevator, and while attempting to free him, Fatty accidentally propels Cutie into the air and onto a moose head mounted on the wall. Fatty and Buster both rescue her, but Fatty takes all the credit and scores himself a date with Cutie.

In order to make himself look even more heroic, Fatty arranges for Buster and the hotel clerk to pretend to rob the town bank so that Fatty can show up on the scene and apprehend them in front of Cutie. However, when Buster and the clerk arrive at the bank they discover that it is already being robbed. The robbers brawl with Fatty, Buster and the clerk, and in the ensuing chaos the thieves get away, hijacking a horse and trolley and riding out of town. Fatty, Buster and the clerk chase the trolley on foot; the local livery stable proprietor (who is also the town constable) gives chase on a motorcycle. The trolley becomes unhooked from the horse whilst in the middle of an uphill climb and comes speeding back down, crashing into the hotel lobby. The thieves are arrested; Fatty is given a reward for apprehending them, and receives a kiss from Cutie.

Cast
 Roscoe 'Fatty' Arbuckle as Bellboy, barber
 Buster Keaton as Bellboy
 Al St. John as Desk Clerk
 Alice Lake as Cutie Cuticle, manicurist
 Joe Keaton as Guest
 Charles Dudley as Guest

See also
 List of American films of 1918
 Roscoe Arbuckle filmography
 Buster Keaton filmography

References

External links 

 The Bell Boy at the International Buster Keaton Society

1918 comedy films
1918 films
1918 short films
1910s American films
American black-and-white films
American silent short films
American comedy short films
Films about bank robbery
Films directed by Roscoe Arbuckle
Films with screenplays by Roscoe Arbuckle
Silent American comedy films